J. D. Williams is an American politician and rancher who served as a member of the Wyoming House of Representatives from the 2nd district from October 22, 2021 to January 10, 2023.

Early life and education 
Williams was born in Scottsbluff, Nebraska. He attended the University of Wyoming and received a Bachelors of Agricultural Economics.

Career 
Williams was appointed to the Wyoming House of Representatives in October 2021 after incumbent Hans Hunt resigned. Williams is a member of the House Travel, Recreation, Wildlife & Cultural Resources Committee. He also works as a rancher.

References 

Living people
Republican Party members of the Wyoming House of Representatives
People from Scottsbluff, Nebraska
University of Wyoming alumni
21st-century American politicians
Year of birth missing (living people)